Gunnar Bolander (20 July 1889 – 19 December 1964) was a Swedish athlete. He competed in the men's discus throw at the 1912 Summer Olympics.

References

1889 births
1964 deaths
Athletes (track and field) at the 1912 Summer Olympics
Swedish male discus throwers
Olympic athletes of Sweden
Place of birth missing